The FAI Super Cup was an association football super cup featuring clubs from the Republic of Ireland. It was played for between 1998 and 2001. It was a pre-season tournament played in the summer before the regular League of Ireland season began. The same four clubs that qualified to represent the Republic of Ireland in UEFA competitions also qualified for the Super Cup. League of Ireland clubs had previously played in a similar competition known as the Top Four Cup. A similar competition, the LFA President's Cup, co-existed with the FAI Super Cup. Since 2014 the FAI has organised a new super cup, the President's Cup.

Format
The first three tournaments were played as a single-elimination tournament, featuring two semi-finals, a third place play-off and a final. The 2001 tournament featured a single round robin group with the group winners being awarded the cup.

History
In 1998 the FAI announce their plans to establish a super cup. It was to be played during the summer and it was intended to act as a warm up and provide the clubs involved in Europe with some competitive games. However the UEFA Intertoto Cup representatives had already played their tie before the FAI Super Cup kicked off. Shamrock Rovers, St Patrick's Athletic, UCD and Shelbourne all won one tournament each.

List of participants

Tournaments

1998 FAI Super Cup
Semi-finals

3rd Place Playoff

Final

1999 FAI Super Cup
Semi-finals

3rd Place Playoff

Final

2000 FAI Super Cup
Semi-finals

3rd Place Playoff

Final

2001 FAI Super Cup

Standings

Matches

References

Ireland Republic
League of Ireland
Defunct association football cup competitions in the Republic of Ireland
Super
Super
Super
FAI cup competitions
1998 establishments in Ireland
2001 disestablishments in Ireland